Govia Thameslink Railway (GTR)  is a train operating company that operates the Thameslink, Southern and Great Northern (TSGN) rail franchise in England. Within the franchise, GTR runs the Thameslink, Great Northern, Southern and Gatwick Express services. GTR is a subsidiary of Govia, which is itself a joint venture between the British Go-Ahead Group (65%) and French company Keolis (35%).

The franchise was awarded, after repeated delays, to Govia Thameslink Railway on 23 May 2014. On 14 September 2014, GTR took over operations for the prior franchisee First Capital Connect; during July 2015, both Southern and Gatwick Express operations were integrated into GTR. This change made it the largest rail franchise in terms of passengers, staff and fleet in the UK. The franchise has an unusual structure involving a management contract that sees all fare revenues going straight to the Department for Transport (DfT), which in turn pays GTR fixed amounts that add up to £8.9billion across its first seven years of operation.

In terms of infrastructure, Govia planned to invest £50million into the 239 stations it manages to improve accessibility, replace information systems, and increase staffing hours, alongside general redevelopment work. Various measures at increasing capacity and improving service were also planned, such as the doubling of overnight Thameslink services, half-hourly King's Lynn to London services, and extending the Oyster card network.

As early as June 2016, GTR was facing public criticism from officials over its performance, including calls from the Mayor of London Sadiq Khan for it to be stripped of the franchise. In May 2018, the company introduced a new timetable which included the first regular services through the Canal Tunnels and to other new destinations previously not served by Thameslink; however, an interim timetable that ran less trains had to be adopted due to frequent service issues. In response to the significant decline of passenger travel amid the COVID-19 pandemic, GTR considerably curtailed its services by mid-2020. GTR is one of several train operators that are experiencing severe disruption of services due to the 2022–2023 United Kingdom railway strikes.

History

Background
During 2006, the Thameslink and Great Northern services were merged into a single franchise due to the upcoming Thameslink Programme. In 2012, the British government announced that services of First Capital Connect, Southern (with Gatwick Express) and some Southeastern routes would be merged into a single Thameslink, Southern and Great Northern franchise (TSGN). The Invitation to Tender was to have been issued in October 2012, with the successful bidder announced during Spring 2013 and TSGN originally due to start in September 2013. However, following the collapse of the InterCity West Coast re-franchising process, it was decided to enact a temporary freeze on all franchising competitions until January 2013.

In January 2013, the government announced that it would extend the existing contract through to March 2014, and that it intended to negotiate with FirstGroup to operate the franchise under a management contract for up to two years. In March 2013, the Secretary of State for Transport announced that the franchise would be extended again to run up to 13 September 2014, and that the future franchise would be a management-style contract due to the level of investment and change on the route. During September 2013, a revised invitation to tender was issued. On 23 May 2014, it was announced that Govia Thameslink Railway had been awarded the franchise.

On 14 September 2014, Govia Thameslink Railway (GTR) took over services from First Capital Connect; at the commencement of operations, it served 122 stations and operated a fleet of 226 trains. The separate Thameslink and Great Northern brands were maintained upon the GTR takeover. During December 2014, full control was taken of the Sevenoaks Thameslink service, previously operated jointly with Southeastern. During July 2015, both Southern and Gatwick Express became a part of GTR, making it the largest rail franchise in terms of passengers, staff and fleet in the UK.

The franchise has an unusual structure: it is a management contract where fare income does not go to GTR. Under their original contract, the Department for Transport pays GTR £8.9billion over the first seven-year period and receives all revenue. Consequently, the company carries less revenue risk. This form of franchise was chosen because of long-term engineering works anticipated around London, which would be a significant challenge to organise within the normal form of franchise.

Changes and disruptions
During December 2015, GTR announced that the majority of its ticket prices would be frozen, and that the average fare rise for the coming year would be only 0.8%.

In June 2016, amongst criticism of the performance of its services, Go-Ahead warned of lower than anticipated profits on the franchises, leading to 18% drop in the Go-Ahead share price. Passengers had previously rated its Thameslink service as the worst in the country. Only 20% of Southern trains arrived on time in the year from April 2015 to March 2016, and there was an ongoing industrial dispute over driver-only operated trains. On 12 July 2016, after 15% of Southern services were cancelled for a period of weeks to improve service reliability, Mayor of London Sadiq Khan called for GTR to be stripped of the franchise. On 15 July 2016, citing the issues, Rail Minister Claire Perry resigned from her position.

In response to the significant decline of passenger travel amid the COVID-19 pandemic, GTR considerably curtailed its services by mid-2020. Between 30 March 2020 and 3 April 2022, Gatwick Express services were suspended.

In March 2022, following changes made due to COVID-19, the DfT gave GTR a direct-award contract expiring on 1 April 2028.

GTR is one of several train operators impacted by the 2022–2023 United Kingdom railway strikes, which are the first national rail strikes in the UK for three decades. Its workers are amongst those who have voted in favour of taking industrial action due to a dispute over pay and working conditions. GTR is only capable of operating a very minimal timetable on any of the planned dates for the strikes due to the number of staff involved.

Thameslink and Great Northern services

Govia Thameslink Railway has operated Thameslink and Great Northern services since 14 September 2014. Great Northern is the name of the suburban rail services run on the southern end of Britain's East Coast Main Line and associated branches.

In May 2018, the company introduced a new timetable which included the first regular services through the Canal Tunnels and to other new destinations previously not served by Thameslink. However, due to frequent disruption of services on the whole network, Govia decided to create a new interim timetable with a reduced number of trains; this came into operation in July 2018.

Thameslink service pattern

Off-peak

Peak hours

Great Northern service pattern
Since the introduction of regular services through the Canal Tunnels during May 2018, many GTR services on the East Coast Main Line were rebranded from Great Northern to Thameslink. Most of these services have been extended through central London and incorporated into the Thameslink network (as per above), although as of October 2019 some services are yet to be extended. The only services to retain the Great Northern brand are those on the Northern City Line and the express services to/from Cambridge, Ely and King's Lynn, as well as Peterborough at peak times.

Southern and Gatwick Express services

The Southern and Gatwick Express brands joined Govia Thameslink Railway on 26 July 2015. Southern routes run from London Victoria and London Bridge through the South London suburbs of Battersea, Norbury, Peckham, Sydenham, Crystal Palace, Norwood, Croydon, Streatham, Purley and Sutton to towns surrounding London including Caterham, Epsom and Tadworth. Further afield, Southern also serve Redhill, Tonbridge, Uckfield, East Grinstead, Gatwick Airport, Brighton, Ashford (Kent), Worthing, Hastings, Portsmouth, Eastbourne, Horsham, Southampton, Littlehampton and Bognor Regis. Since 2008, Southern has operated the Gatwick Express service from London Victoria to Gatwick Airport and Brighton.

Gatwick Express

Southern

Franchise commitments 

This franchise is different from many other franchises let since the start of railway privatisation in 1996. Under the agreed terms of the franchise, the operator, in this case Govia, gives all revenue to the government, rather than paying set premiums. The Department for Transport will pay Govia, totalling around £8.9billion over the franchise period of seven years, from the expected revenues of £12.4billion. From these payments, Govia expects to generate a 3% profit, and the risks on operating costs will be Govia's, while the DfT will profit or lose from fluctuations in revenue.

Prior to the start of the franchise, Govia stated its plans to invest £50million in all 239 stations that it would manage. The specifics of these plans include:
 Enhance all 239 stations including improving access, replace electronic information screens and working with local authorities on the redevelopment of St Albans and Luton stations.
 Increase staffing hours at many stations, with the 100 busiest stations staffed from first to last train, like London Overground stations.
 Extension of 'the key' smartcard which Southern has been introducing.
 Provide 104 stations with free Wi-Fi.
 £1.5million on station access improvements including increased cycle storage and electrical vehicle charging points.

Govia also stated its intention to bring about the following:
 Half-hourly King's Lynn to London services
 Direct Peterborough, Cambridge, Welwyn Garden City and Finsbury Park to Tattenham Corner, Caterham, Horsham services.
 Increasing Great Northern suburban services to four trains per hour via Enfield Chase and New Barnet
 Great Northern suburban services to run to Moorgate at weekends and on weekday evenings
 50% increase in capacity from Uckfield to London in the peaks.
 Doubling overnight Thameslink services
 Sevenoaks Thameslink services to run on Saturdays
 Working to extend Oyster to Epsom, Gatwick Airport, Luton Airport Parkway, Welwyn Garden City and Hertford North
 Class 387 Electrostars for King's Lynn express services, releasing Class 317s, 321s and some Class 365s for newly electrified routes elsewhere.
 Creating an alliance arrangement with Network Rail in 2016, like South West Trains.

Rolling stock 
In order to replace the  trains and to operate the expanded Thameslink network, a fleet of 115 eight- and twelve-car  trains had been procured during the franchise term of First Capital Connect. These entered service between 2016 and 2019.

As a consequence of the delayed procurement of the Class 700 trains, 29  trains had also been ordered for the Thameslink route to release the Class 319 trains to newly electrified routes. Deliveries were completed during 2014 and the trains entered service later that year. It was originally planned that once the Class 700s began entering service, the Class 387s would be transferred to Great Western Railway for use on routes in the Thames Valley. However, a change of plans saw GWR order an entirely new fleet of Class 387s, so the Thameslink units were instead cascaded to the Great Northern route following delivery of the Class 700s.

In addition to these, GTR ordered 25 new six-car trains to replace 40-year-old  units, which were being run on the Great Northern suburban services out of Moorgate. During December 2015, Siemens was selected to provide these as a follow-on to the Class 700 order.

Current fleet

Past fleet 
Former units operated by Thameslink, Southern and Great Northern include:

Performance 

In February 2015, Thameslink and Great Northern came at the bottom of Which? magazine's Best and worst UK train companies customer survey, scoring a customer satisfaction score of 43%. Thameslink and Great Northern were also scored 2/5 stars in each of the specific categories covered by the survey (including Reliability, Punctuality and Cleanliness of toilets) – which is the worst performance of any UK train operator. In the Which? 2017 survey, Thameslink and Great Northern improved their performance slightly with a rating of 46% also, their position in the table was second to bottom(Southern were in bottom place, but had been subject huge disruption due to industrial action).

Passenger numbers on Govia Thameslink Railway (which also includes Southern and Gatwick Express) have risen from 262million annually in 2010–11 to 327million annually in 2015–16.

Notes

References

External links

 Thameslink website
 Great Northern website
 Southern website
 Gatwick Express website

2014 establishments in England
Airport rail links in London
Go-Ahead Group companies
Keolis
Rail transport in East Sussex
Rail transport in Hampshire
Rail transport in Kent
Rail transport in Surrey
Rail transport in West Sussex
Railway operators in London
Thameslink
Train operating companies in the United Kingdom